Nassau County may refer to:

 Nassau County, Florida
 Nassau County, New York
 County of Nassau, a former county and state of the Holy Roman Empire ruled by the Counts of Nassau, in modern Germany

See also
 Nassau (disambiguation)